This list of museums in the unincorporated territories of the United States encompasses museums defined for this context as institutions (including nonprofit organizations, government entities, and private businesses) that collect and care for objects of cultural, artistic, scientific, or historical interest and make their collections or related exhibits available for public viewing. Museums that exist only in cyberspace (i.e., virtual museums) are not included.

U.S. territories

American Samoa
Jean P. Haydon Museum — Pago Pago (museum about American Samoa)

Guam
 Guam Museum — Hagåtña website
 Isla Center for the Arts, University of Guam, website
 Marianas Military Museum at the U.S. Naval Station, website
 National Museum of the Dulce Nombre de Maria Cathedral-Basilica — Hagåtña
 Houamla Collection of African Arts — Yigo
 Pacific War Museum — Hagåtña
 Seaside Museum, a part of Jeff's Pirates Cove, a beach bar — Talofofo  Web page
 Senator Angel Leon Guerrero Santos Latte Stone Memorial Park — Hagåtña
 South Pacific Memorial Park — Yigo
 T. Stell Newman Visitor Center — Santa Rita
 War in the Pacific National Historical Park — Asan-Maina

Northern Mariana Islands
 American Memorial Park — Saipan
 Japanese Air Operations Building (and grounds) — Tinian
 Northern Mariana Islands Museum of History and Culture (NMI Museum) — Saipan
 World War 2 Museum — Saipan

Puerto Rico

See List of museums in Puerto Rico

U.S. Minor Outlying Islands
 World War II Facilities at Midway — Midway Atoll

Virgin Islands (U.S.)
 Caribbean Museum Center For The Arts — Frederiksted
 Christiansted Apothecary Hall — Christiansted, website
 Cinnamon Bay Interpretive Center — Cruz Bay
 Fort Christian — Charlotte Amalie
 Fort Frederik — Frederiksted
 French Heritage Museum — Charlotte Amalie
 Haagensen House — Charlotte Amalie
 Lawaetz Museum — Frederiksted website
 Pirate's Treasure Museum — Havensight
 Saint Thomas Historical Trust Museum — Charlotte Amalie
 The House That Freedom Built — Christiansted
 The Virgin Islands Children's Museum — Havensight
 Whim Plantation Museum (Estate Whim Sugar Mill) — Frederiksted, website

See also
List of museumsList of museums in the United States
National Register of Historic Places listings in American Samoa
 National Register of Historic Places listings in Guam
 National Register of Historic Places listings in the Northern Mariana Islands
 National Register of Historic Places listings in the U.S. Virgin Islands
 National Register of Historic Places listings in the United States Minor Outlying Islands
 List of United States National Historic Landmarks in the U.S. territories

Puerto Rico 
 National Register of Historic Places listings in Puerto Rico
 Botanical gardens in Puerto Rico (category)
 Houses in Puerto Rico (category)
 Forts in Puerto Rico (category)
 Observatories in Puerto Rico (category)

Notes

References

Museums
Territories